Francis James Spaniel, Jr. (May 21, 1928 – October 25, 1994) was an American football halfback in the National Football League for the Baltimore Colts and the Washington Redskins.  He played college football at the University of Notre Dame and was drafted in the fifth round of the 1950 NFL Draft.

1928 births
1994 deaths
American football halfbacks
Players of American football from Pennsylvania
Baltimore Colts (1947–1950) players
Notre Dame Fighting Irish football players
People from Westmoreland County, Pennsylvania
Washington Redskins players